Events from the year 1667 in Sweden

Incumbents
 Monarch – Charles XI

Events

 Inauguration of the theater in Lejonkulan in Stockholm, the first confirmed permanent theater in Sweden.

Births

 Brita Biörn, famous cunning woman (died unknown year)

Deaths

 February 4 - Gustaf Bonde (1620–1667), statesman (born 1620) 
 - George Fleetwood (Swedish general), general (born 1605) 
 March 23 - Johan Papegoja, governor (born unknown)

References

 
Years of the 17th century in Sweden
Sweden